Rhagastis meridionalis is a moth of the family Sphingidae first described by Bruno Gehlen in 1928. It is known from Java.

References

Rhagastis
Moths described in 1928